St. Andrew's School is a  school in Bandar Seri Begawan, Brunei, located opposite Pusar Ulak Primary School.

History 
The educational institution was founded as an Anglican school in January 1956 by Canon Paul Chong En Siong, as a primary school with 70 students and 3 teachers. It was the first Anglican school in Brunei. Until 1964 it was based in a church vicarage. That year it moved to its current locations, a site donated by Dato Paduka Ong Kim Kee. The school introduced Computer Studies classes in 1995.

References

External links

Private schools in Brunei
Andrew's School, Brunei
Anglican schools in Brunei
Primary schools in Brunei
Secondary schools in Brunei
Educational institutions established in 1956
Buildings and structures in Bandar Seri Begawan
1956 establishments in Brunei